The Grupo de Ações Táticas Especiais (Portuguese for Special Tactical Actions Group), mostly known by its acronym GATE, is a hostage rescue and bomb disposal unit of the Military Police of São Paulo State in Brazil. It is made up of the 4th, 5th and 6th Companies of the 4th Shock Police Battalion, which it shares with the Comandos e Operações Especiais.

History

GATE was created following a case in 18 February 1987, when former ITA students held a three-month old baby, Tabata, hostage for eight hours in Mogi das Cruzes. At around 6 p.m., the suspects were killed after a shootout and Tabata was rescued, sustaining knife wounds in the process. The case convinced the Military Police of the need to create a specially trained team for hostage rescue operations. The unit was declared operational in 4 August 1988. 

GATE is subordinate to the 4th Shock Police Battalion, which in turn is subordinate to the Shock Police Command (CPChq). It was initially made up of former members of ROTA. At the unit level it is commanded by a Major and is operationally divided into tactical teams, snipers teams, negotiation teams as well as a bomb squad.

GATE's attributions are high-complexity situations such as hostage rescue and bomb disposal.

Doctrine

GATE modeled its operational performance after American police SWAT (Special Weapons And Tactics) groups. Later complemented its doctrine after Europeans special operations police groups like, GSG9 (German federal police) and the GIGN - Groupe d'Intervention de la Gendarmerie Nationale (France).

Selection

Currently, enrollment in GATE is given upon completion of the course of Special Tactical Actions, lasting 6 weeks.

See also
Rondas Ostensivas Tobias de Aguiar - PMESP's elite ostensive patrols unit
Comandos e Operações Especiais - PMESP's special operations unit

References

External links
The unit's Instagram page

Police tactical units
Hostage rescue units
Specialist police agencies of Brazil
São Paulo
Organisations based in São Paulo (state)
Special forces of Brazil